American contemporary Christian music (CCM) artist Chris Tomlin has released eight studio albums, two independent albums, two live albums, one compilation album, and twenty-one singles.

Starting with his first commercial album release of The Noise We Make and gaining momentum with his studio album Arriving, Chris Tomlin has quickly become one of the most recognized singer/songwriters and activists within contemporary Christian music industry. His music is considered among the most sung with his music being sung in over 3.12 million churches worldwide. He was awarded Male Vocalist of the Year at the 2006, 2007 (along with Artist of the Year) and 2008 GMA Dove Awards and a Grammy Award for Best Contemporary Christian Music Album in 2012. He has sold more than 4.2 million albums and has over 6 million digital downloads.

His album in 2013 titled Burning Lights debuted at No. 1 on the Billboard 200 charts, becoming the fourth CCM album in history to do so. His third studio album Arriving has been certified Platinum as well as his singles "Our God" and "How Great Is Our God".

Albums

Studio albums

Live albums

Compilation albums

Extended plays

Independent albums

Singles

As featured artist

Other charted songs

Non-album songs
"Whisper My Name" [Forefront] - Eterne: Never Be the Same (2000)
"Salvation" - Pour Over Me - Worship Together Live 2001 (2001)
"Give Us Clean Hands" - Pour Over Me - Worship Together Live 2001 (2001)
"Satisfied" [Forefront] - Secrets Of The Vine: Music... A Worship Experience (2002)
"Lord, I'm Gonna Love You" [Sparrow] - Your Love Broke Through (2002)
"Expressions of Your Love" (duet w/ Rebecca St. James) [Sparrow] - It Takes Two: 15 Collaborations & Duets (2003)
"Where the Streets Have No Name" [Sparrow/EMI CMG] - In the Name of Love: Artists United for Africa (2004)
"You're the One" [Disney/EMI CMG] - Music Inspired by The Chronicles of Narnia: The Lion, the Witch and the Wardrobe (2005)
"Angels We Have Heard on High" [Word] - WOW Christmas: Green (2005)
"Mighty to Save" [Integrity] - Bonus disc included with Fruitcake and Ice Cream DVD (2008)
"Your Heart (David)" - Music Inspired by The Story (2011)
"Heart of God - Live" - III Live at Hillsong Conference (2018)

Music videos
 "Expressions of Your Love" (with Rebecca St. James) (2004)
 "Amazing Grace (My Chains are Gone)" (2007)
 "I Lift My Hands" (2011)
 "He Shall Reign Forevermore" (2015)
 "Good Good Father" (with Pat Barrett) (2016)
 "Jesus" (2016)
 "Home" (2017)
 "Resurrection Power" (2018)
 "Nobody Loves Me Like You Love Me Jesus" (2018)

Notes

References

External links
 Chris Tomlin at AllMusic

Christian music discographies
Discographies of American artists